Mezam is a division of the North West Region of Cameroon. The department covers an area of 1745 km and as of 2005 had a total population of 524,127. The capital of the department lies at Bamenda.

Subdivisions
The department is divided administratively into 5 communes and in turn into villages. The Abakwa Central district is further divided into 3 sub-districts, namely Bamenda I, Bamenda II and Bamenda III.

Communes 
 Bafut
 Bali
  Abakwa Central
 Santa
 Tubah

References

Departments of Cameroon
Northwest Region (Cameroon)